Arvid Holm (born November 3, 1998) is a Swedish professional ice hockey goaltender who currently plays for the Manitoba Moose in the American Hockey League (AHL) as a prospect to the Winnipeg Jets of the National Hockey League (NHL). Holm was drafted in the sixth round, 167th overall, of the 2017 NHL Entry Draft by the Jets.

Playing career
Holm played in the native Sweden with Färjestad BK of the Swedish Hockey League (SHL). On 16 June 2020, Holm was signed to a three-year, entry-level contract with his draft club, the Winnipeg Jets.

Career statistics

Regular season and playoffs

References

External links
 

|

1998 births
Färjestad BK players
Karlskrona HK players
Living people
People from Ljungby Municipality
Manitoba Moose players
Swedish ice hockey goaltenders
Winnipeg Jets draft picks
Sportspeople from Kronoberg County